The Finca Chibigui salamander (Bolitoglossa medemi) is a species of salamander in the family Plethodontidae.
It is found in Colombia and Panama.
Its natural habitat is subtropical or tropical moist lowland forests.
It is threatened by habitat loss.

References

Bolitoglossa
Amphibians of Colombia
Amphibians of Panama
Amphibians described in 1972
Taxonomy articles created by Polbot